Euxoa emolliens is a moth of the family Noctuidae. It is found in Ukraine and southern Russia.

External links
Fauna Europaea

Euxoa
Insects of Turkey
Moths described in 1905